Osów is a municipal neighbourhood of the city of Szczecin, Poland situated on the left bank of Oder river, north-west of the Szczecin Old Town and Middle Town, in Zachód (West) District. As of January 2011 it had a population of 3,417.

Before 1945 when Stettin was a part of Germany, the German name of this suburb was Stettin-Wussow.

References 

Neighbourhoods of Szczecin